"Coconut" is a novelty song written and first recorded by American singer-songwriter Harry Nilsson, released as the third single from his 1971 album, Nilsson Schmilsson. It was on the U.S. Billboard charts for 14 weeks, reaching #8, and was ranked by Billboard as the #66 song for 1972.  It charted minorly in the UK, reaching #42.  "Coconut" did best in Canada, where it peaked at #5.

In 1998, a cover version was released by Australian singer Dannii Minogue as a single, peaking at #62 on the ARIA singles chart.

Lyrics
The lyrics feature Nilsson singing three characters (a narrator, a woman and a doctor), each in a different voice. The woman drinks a mixture of lime juice and coconut water, becomes sick, and calls the doctor. The doctor, annoyed at being woken up, tells her to drink the same thing again and call in the morning.

Music
There are no chord changes in the song: an arpeggiated C7th accompanies the song.

Personnel
According to the 1971 LP credits:
 Harry Nilsson – vocals
 Caleb Quaye – guitar
 Ian Duck – acoustic guitar
 Herbie Flowers – bass
 Jim Gordon – drums, percussion
 Roger Pope – drums

Chart history

Weekly charts

Year-end charts

Dannii Minogue version

Dannii Minogue recorded the song in 1994 with UK dance producers DNA. When Minogue parted ways with Mushroom Records in 1995 and signed to Eternal Records in 1996, she had the track remixed by producers Flexifinger.

The track was originally used as a hidden bonus track on her third album Girl. It was subsequently released in Australia on 16 November 1998 as the fourth and final single from that album, peaking at number 62 on the ARIA singles chart upon its debut, on the chart dated week commencing 23 November 1998.

In 2009, the original version of "Coconut" was made available on the compilation The 1995 Sessions.

Charts

References

1971 songs
1971 singles
1998 singles
Calypso songs
Harry Nilsson songs
Dannii Minogue songs
Novelty songs
Songs written by Harry Nilsson
Song recordings produced by Richard Perry
Songs about physicians
Coconuts
RCA Victor singles
Warner Music Group singles